Artūrs Strēlnieks (born July 31, 1985) is a Latvian professional basketball player, who plays the shooting guard position. He's currently playing for BK Jūrmala/Fēnikss.

Professional career
After bouncing around couple of semi-pro teams, Artūrs Strēlnieks started his pro career at age 24 when he was signed by BK Ventspils in September 2009.

He played next three years for Ventspils establishing himself as a solid player that excels on defensive end.

In July 2012, Artūrs moved to VEF Rīga. In April 2014, he was signed to a three-year extension.

On July 19, 2016, he signed with the Latvian team Jūrmala/Fēnikss.

Personal life
His younger brother, Jānis, is also a professional basketball player.

References

External links
 Eurocup Profile
 VEF Rīga Player Profile

1985 births
Living people
BK VEF Rīga players
BK Ventspils players
Latvian men's basketball players
People from Talsi
Shooting guards